The Kenya Police Reserve (KPR) was formed in 1948 to assist the regular Kenya Police in the maintenance of law and order. The KPR now only exists in arid and semi arid  rural areas of Kenya, particularly in Northern Kenya. The KPR is not to be confused with the Kikuyu Home Guard.

Antecedents to the KPR
In  1943, the Kenya Legislative Council passed a National Service Act that made conscription compulsory for Kenya Europeans. This was amended in 1944 with the Auxiliary Police Ordinance, which made provision for conscripts to fulfill their national service in the Auxiliary police, supporting the regular Kenya Police. (The Kenya Police were at this time under pressure from war-time commitments). The Auxiliary Police regulations lasted from January 1945 until February 1947, after which they were repealed. It was found, however, that the Kenya Police were still short of personnel, and in February 1947 it was agreed that 255 former Auxiliary Police would be retained on a voluntary basis, but would be known as Special Police, their basis in law being section 70 of the Kenya Police Ordinance which made provision for what in the UK would be called special constabulary. In 1948 a new Kenya Police Ordinance was brought into law, section 57 of which makes provision for the Special Police.

Establishment of the KPR in 1948
In early 1948 the Kenya Police Reserve Ordinance was passed to establish the Kenya Police Reserve. It too was set up on the lines of the UK special constabulary, with a command structure in parallel to that of the regular force. Uniforms and scales of equipment were identical to that of the regular force, although the KPR wore brass badges rather than the chrome badges of the regular force. KPR members were armed, and in remote areas were allowed to keep their weapons at home; but they were not issued with automatic weapons (this provision was lifted during the Mau Mau uprising). The KPR was open to Europeans, Asians and Africans, although Europeans were favoured with automatic promotion to Inspector rank.

The Special Police did not disband, but remained in operation alongside the KPR. In March 1953 the Special Police were expanded dramatically when Africans were allowed to join; some 2000 did so, and served with distinction. They did not receive the full uniform of the police and used improvised weapons at first. Eventually the Special Police were issued rifles, as the reliability and efficiency of the SP was demonstrated.

The KPR were the originators of the Kenya Police Reserve Air Wing, with KPR members donating the use of their private aircraft. They played a vital role in supplying aerial intelligence and air-dropped supplies to forces fighting the Mau Mau.

Recent developments
In post colonial Kenya the KPR carried on very much as when it was originated. In rural areas of Kenya, very often the KPR are the only police presence. Armed with obsolete rifles, they are the first line of defence against bandits and cattle raiders.

In May 2004 the Kenya Government disbanded the KPR in urban areas, noting that the various city units had become corrupt and unmanageable. In 2005 the Government announced an aspiration to re-constitute the KPR, a but this has yet to happen.

In May 2019 the Inspector General withdrew guns from the KPR in north rift counties, noting that the various rural units were misusing their weapons to attack residents.

In June the same year the Government recruited a team of 40 integrated KPR who underwent training at the NPS College Magadi. These NPRs were later deployed at volatile counties, where they had been withdrawn a month earlier, to beef up  security.

The Special Police, although still allowed for by law, do not function in the modern period.

References

WR Foran  The Kenya Police 1887 - 1960  ( London: Robert Hale, 1962)
"Handbook of Information for the Guidance of members of the Kenya Police Reserve and Special Police Officers" (Nairobi: English Press, n.d.) - an official KPR publication, although undated it can be located in the period 1950-52.

Police Reserves
Organizations established in 1948
1948 in Kenya